Sayaka Aoki may refer to:
Sayaka Aoki (comedian) (born 1973), Japanese comedian
Sayaka Aoki (voice actress) (born 1972), Japanese voice actress
Sayaka Aoki (athlete) (born 1986), Japanese athlete